Christopher Duke Sandford (born 6 June 1939) is a British actor. He has appeared in more than fifty films since 1956.

He also worked in the music business for a spell in the 1960s as a both a singer, and radio DJ, before returning to the acting profession.

More recently he is the author of several books on fly-fishing, The Best of British Baits: An Identification Guide to Artificial Lures from 1849–1930 (1997), A Wellie Full of Water (2008), Flytyers' Flies: The Flies That Catch Fish (2009), and Mayflies and More: A Flytyers' Guide to the Chalkstreams (2012).

Selected filmography

References

External links

1939 births
Living people
British male film actors
British male television actors
Transatlantic Records artists